Kopi John (10 October 1993 – 27 August 2019) was a Papua New Guinean cricketer. In July 2018, she was named in Papua New Guinea's squad for the 2018 ICC Women's World Twenty20 Qualifier tournament. She made her Women's Twenty20 International (WT20I) for Papua New Guinea against Bangladesh in the World Twenty20 Qualifier on 7 July 2018. In April 2019, she was named in Papua New Guinea's squad for the 2019 ICC Women's Qualifier EAP tournament in Vanuatu.

John died on 27 August 2019 following a short illness. She was 25.

References

External links
 

1993 births
2019 deaths
Papua New Guinean women cricketers
Papua New Guinea women Twenty20 International cricketers
Place of birth missing